Sergei Sergeyevich Smirnov (born 17 December 1981) is a Russian former professional footballer.

Honours
 Belarusian Premier League bronze: 2003.

External links
 

1981 births
Living people
Russian footballers
Russia under-21 international footballers
Russian expatriate footballers
Association football midfielders
Expatriate footballers in Belarus
Expatriate footballers in Kazakhstan
Russian expatriate sportspeople in Kazakhstan
FC Dinamo Minsk players
FC Zhenis Astana players
FC Mostransgaz Gazoprovod players
FC Izhevsk players
Belarusian Premier League players
Kazakhstan Premier League players
FC Znamya Truda Orekhovo-Zuyevo players